Wolhusen railway station is a railway station in the municipality of Wolhusen, in the Swiss canton of Lucerne. It is located at the junction of the standard gauge Bern–Lucerne line of Swiss Federal Railways and the Huttwil–Wolhusen line of BLS AG.

Services 
The following services stop at Wolhusen:

 Lucerne S-Bahn:
 : rush-hour service between Willisau and Lucerne.

References

External links 
 
 

Railway stations in the canton of Lucerne
Swiss Federal Railways stations